Colere is a comune (municipality) in the Province of Bergamo in the Italian region of Lombardy, located about  northeast of Milan and about  northeast of Bergamo.

Colere borders the following municipalities: Angolo Terme, Azzone, Castione della Presolana, Rovetta, Vilminore di Scalve.

Demographic evolution

References

External links